Morgan Chu (born December 27, 1950), (Chinese: 朱慶文; pinyin: Zhū Qìngwén) is an American intellectual property attorney.

A high-school dropout, Chu went on to earn advanced degrees from Harvard, Yale and UCLA.  In 2007, UCLA awarded Chu the UCLA Medal, the university's highest accolade for exceptional achievement, citing Chu's "groundbreaking approach to intellectual property" and honoring him as a founder of the Asian American Studies Center.

Chu was named The Outstanding Intellectual Property Lawyer in the United States in the first Chambers Award for Excellence, 2006.

Chu served as the co-managing partner of the firm Irell & Manella LLP from 1997–2003, and has been a member of its governing board, the Executive Committee, since 1985. In June 2009, Harvard alumni elected Chu to a six-year term as a member of the Harvard Board of Overseers.

Family

Morgan Chu's father, Ju-Chin Chu, left China in 1943 to study chemical engineering, earning a doctorate at the Massachusetts Institute of Technology (MIT), and he later taught at Washington University in St. Louis and at Brooklyn Polytechnic Institute. Chu's mother Ching Chen Li, also left China during World War II to study economics at MIT. His parents married in 1945 and began a family.

Chu is the youngest of three brothers. His oldest brother, Gilbert Chu, holds an M.D. and a Ph.D., and is a professor of biochemistry and medicine at Stanford University. The middle brother, Steven Chu, was a professor of physics at Stanford and later a professor of physics and molecular and cellular biology at University of California, Berkeley, and the director of Lawrence Berkeley National Laboratory. Steven Chu was awarded the Nobel Prize for Physics in 1997 and was President Obama's Secretary of Energy from January 21, 2009, to April 22, 2013.

Education
Chu dropped out of high school and left home but by age 25 he had five university degrees. Although he never received a high school diploma, he gained admittance to UCLA, where he earned a B.A. (1971) in political science, and a M.A. (1972) and Ph.D (1973) in urban educational policy planning. Chu then received a Master of Studies in Law from Yale Law School (1974) and a Juris Doctor, magna cum laude, from Harvard Law School (1976)

Legal career

Following his law school graduation, Chu served as a law clerk for Hon. Charles M. Merrill, U.S. Court of Appeals for the Ninth Circuit (1976–1977). In 1977, Chu went to work as an associate at the Los Angeles law firm of Irell & Manella. Chu was elevated to partner in 1982, and became the firm's co-managing partner in 1997, serving two terms until 2003.
Chu is known for his many high-profile trials involving technology including:
 In 2002, Chu won a $500 million jury verdict for City of Hope against Genentech.   Punitive damages were later reversed by the California Supreme Court, but the compensatory damages represent the largest judgment ever affirmed on appeal in California.  The defendant ultimately paid a judgment of over $480 million including interest.
 Chu won a $120 million jury verdict for Stac Electronics against Microsoft.  The trial court entered a worldwide injunction against Microsoft's flagship product, the MS-DOS operating system, and then the case settled.
 Chu was co-counsel for the plaintiff in Texas Instruments v. Samsung, which resulted in a settlement for the plaintiff of more than $1 billion.
 In 2006 in Immersion v. Sony, Chu won a $82 million jury verdict and injunction that led to a final resolution of over $150 million being paid by Sony.
 In TiVo v. EchoStar, Chu secured a $74 million jury verdict and permanent injunction, which were upheld on appeal.  $105 million has been paid on the final judgment including post-verdict damages.
 In 2005 Chu was recognized for one of the "Top Ten Defense Verdicts," for Ultratech Stepper Inc. v. ASML, in which the jury unanimously found plaintiff's patent invalid.
 Chu successfully defended Candle Corporation in the first trial in the U.S. involving a software patent. The jury unanimously found the plaintiff's patent invalid.
 Chu successfully represented NantKwest, Inc. in the 2019 Supreme Court case Peter v. NantKwest, Inc. against the United States Patent and Trademark Office. The Supreme Court ruled unanimously in favour of his client, finding that the Patent Act did not require his client to pay the Patent and Trademark Office's attorney fees.
 Chu won a $2.18 billion jury verdict in the Western District of Texas in 2021 in VLSI v. Intel Corp.  This is the largest standing jury verdict in a patent case.

Public service

When Chu was still an undergraduate at UCLA, he co-founded UCLA's Asian American Studies Center. He has previously served on the Board of Governors of the University of California, Los Angeles Foundation. Mr. Chu also has been an adjunct professor of law at UCLA School of Law and has served as a judge pro tem.

At Harvard Law School, Chu was an editor of the Harvard Civil Rights-Civil Liberties Law Review, a leading legal journal founded to promote personal freedoms and human dignities.

Since law school, Chu has been a frequent lecturer and teacher.
He participated in symposia at Harvard Law School and the Harvard Kennedy School of Government, and he was the Traphagen Distinguished Speaker at Harvard in 2003.  Chu served as an adjunct professor at UCLA Law School from 1978 to 1981. He has lectured or delivered papers at Stanford, U.C. Berkeley, Georgetown, Northwestern, California Institute of Technology, UCLA, University of Southern California, among other venues.

Chu was Founding Chair of U.S.C. Law School's Intellectual Property Law Institute (2004–06), and has served on its Executive Committee since 2004.

Chu serves on the Board and Executive Committee of Public Counsel, the largest pro bono public interest law firm in the world.
In one of his pro bono cases, Chu spent six years securing the reversal of a conviction of a death row inmate, the first reversal upheld by the U.S. Supreme Court of a conviction and death penalty in the 20 years since California had reinstated the death penalty.

Chu and his wife Helen have endowed student scholarships at Harvard and UCLA, as well as the Irell & Manella Graduate School of Biological Sciences (IMGSBS) at City of Hope.

In 2021, Chu and his wife Helen donated $1 million to Public Counsel to establish the Helen & Morgan Chu Chief Executive Officer Distinguished Chair.

Awards and honors
Chu has received awards and honors as one of the top attorneys in the United States, as well as for his contributions to higher education and the community.  They include:
 Honorary Doctorate, Irell & Manella Graduate School of Biological Sciences
 UCLA Medal (June 2007)
 Top Intellectual Property Lawyer in the United States in the first Chambers Award for Excellence, 2006.
 Distinguished Advocate (2006).  The Edward A. Heafey Jr. Center for Trial and Appellate Advocacy at Santa Clara University School of Law each year selects one outstanding trial or appellate lawyer to visit the law school as a "Distinguished Advocate."
 PACE-Setter Award (2004) from the Pacific Asian Consortium in Employment
 Learned Hand Award (2003) from the American Jewish Committee
 "Top Ten Trial Lawyers" in the nation from the National Law Journal
 "100 Most Influential Lawyers in America" from the National Law Journal
 At the age of 16, Chu and six others participated in the Subway Challenge, setting the Guinness World Record for traveling through every New York City Subway station in the shortest time on one fare: 22 hours  minutes.

References

1950 births
Living people
American people of Chinese descent
California lawyers
Harvard Law School alumni
Members of the Harvard Board of Overseers
Place of birth missing (living people)
University of California, Los Angeles alumni
Yale Law School alumni
Washington University in St. Louis faculty